Hoseynabad (also Romanized as Ḩoseynābād, Husainābād, and Khusaynabad) is a village in Chuqur Rural District, Tarom Sofla District, Qazvin County, Qazvin Province, Iran. At the 2006 census, its population was 151, in 36 families.

References 

Populated places in Qazvin County